Steve Rogers is the secret identity of the character Captain America.
 Steve Rogers (Marvel Cinematic Universe), a character in the Marvel Cinematic Universe
Steve, Steven, or Stephen Rogers may also refer to:
 Stephen H. Rogers (born 1930), American ambassador
 Stephen Rogers (politician) (born 1942), Canadian politician
 Steve Rogers (baseball) (born 1949), American Major League baseball player
 Steve Rogers (American football) (born 1953), American football player
 Steve Rogers (rugby league) (1954–2006), Australian rugby league footballer and administrator
 Steven S. Rogers (born c. 1959), founder of the Ebony Experiment
 Steve Rogers (basketball) (born 1968), American basketball player
 Steven Rogers (screenwriter) (fl. 1990s–2010s), American screenwriter